Brian Kendall Sims (born September 16, 1978) is an American politician, activist and attorney. A Democrat, he was a member of the Pennsylvania House of Representatives for the 182nd district from 2013 until 2022. Sims is also a lawyer and advocate for LGBT civil rights. Sims is the first openly-gay elected state legislator in Pennsylvania history. He won re-election on November 6, 2018. He was a candidate for the Democratic nomination for lieutenant governor of Pennsylvania in 2022, finishing in second place behind Austin Davis with 25% of the vote.

Early life and education
Sims was born in Washington, D.C., the son of two Army lieutenant colonels of Irish descent. Sims was raised in the Catholic Church but stopped attending church at the age of 16. Sims lived in seventeen states before settling in Pennsylvania in the early-1990s. He graduated from Downingtown High School in Downingtown, Pennsylvania, in 1997. He later completed his undergraduate studies at Bloomsburg University, in Bloomsburg, Pennsylvania, in 2001. In 2000, Sims was the co-captain of the Bloomsburg University football team, and was recognized as a scholar athlete. During the 2000 season, the longest season in the Division II school's history, Sims came out as gay to his teammates. In doing so, the regional All-American and team captain became the only openly gay college football captain in NCAA history.

In 2004, Sims earned a Juris Doctor in international and comparative law at the Michigan State University College of Law. In 2013, Sims completed Harvard University's John F. Kennedy School of Government program for Senior Executives in State and Local Government as a David Bohnett LGBTQ Victory Institute Leadership Fellow.

Career
Sims worked as the president of Equality Pennsylvania and the chairman of the Gay and Lesbian Lawyers of Philadelphia (GALLOP), until he stepped down from both positions in 2011. In 2009, Sims joined the faculty of the Center for Progressive Leadership and the National Campaign Board of the Gay & Lesbian Victory Fund. He was selected as one of the Top 40 LGBT Attorneys Under 40 in the United States by the National LGBT Bar Association in 2010.

Before assuming public office, Sims served as staff counsel for policy and planning at the Philadelphia Bar Association. During his time at the Bar Association, Sims worked with attorneys, legislators and community organizations on issues ranging from gender and pay inequity to environmental regulation.

Pennsylvania House of Representatives
In 2011, Sims announced his intentions to run for representative of the 182nd Legislative District in the Pennsylvania House of Representatives. Sims defeated Babette Josephs, a 28-year incumbent, in the 2012 Democratic primary. He did not face a Republican challenger in the November general election and was elected.

Sims was the first openly gay person elected to the Pennsylvania General Assembly. Although he was not sworn in until January 1, 2013, because Pennsylvania state representatives' term of service and legislative duties officially begin on the first day of December following their election, Sims shares the designation of being its first openly gay member with Rep. Mike Fleck (R–Huntingdon), who came out in a newspaper article published later that day.

In June 2013, after the Defense of Marriage Act had been ruled unconstitutional by the Supreme Court, Sims tried to make a speech in the Pennsylvania House supporting the decision, but was blocked by Daryl Metcalfe, among others, who called Sims' comments "open rebellion against God's law."

Sims made national news on October 3, 2013, when he and fellow Democratic Rep. Steve McCarter introduced legislation to legalize same-sex marriage in Pennsylvania. Sims has also introduced a bill with fellow Democratic State Representative Erin Molchany to help reduce and eliminate the gender gap in rate of pay as well as legislation to ban the practice of conversion therapy with Rep. Gerald Mullery.

Sims has also made efforts to work with federal legislators on issues of LGBT civil rights. On March 28, 2013, Sims penned an open letter to U.S. Senator and fellow Pennsylvania Democrat Bob Casey Jr. urging him to come out publicly in support of same-sex marriage. This, combined with many other calls, ultimately resulted in the senator voicing his support for the measure. Senator Pat Toomey (R-PA) also chose to vote for the Employment Non-Discrimination Act (ENDA) in the U.S. Senate after Sims and a number of other activists wrote to him on the matter.

On November 11, 2013, Sims teamed with Republican State Representative Bryan Cutler to introduce a bill to replace Pennsylvania's system of electing judges with a merit-based system, which did not receive debate in the PA House.

Sims served on the House Commerce, Game and Fish, Human Services, State Government, and Tourism and Recreation Committees. Sims served as Democratic Chair of the Human Services Subcommittee on Mental Health.

Sims has served as the prime sponsor of 68 bills or resolutions, of these, one bill has progressed to be debated on the house floor, and nine resolutions have been passed.

After The New York Times tweeted a cartoon portraying Trump and Putin as a gay couple, Sims characterized the joke as homophobic.

Sims received attention in 2019 for videos he posted to social media confronting people protesting outside of a Planned Parenthood facility in Philadelphia. In April of that year, Sims offered $100 to anyone who could dox three protesters. A few weeks later, in May, Sims posted another eight-minute video of himself confronting a woman who was protesting by praying with a rosary outside the same facility. He suggested it was unchristian and racist to "shame" people engaging in a lawful activity. He encouraged his social media followers to dox her and protest outside her house. Sims also criticized Catholicism by referring to its record on child molestation.

Following the incidents, more than one thousand anti-abortion protesters rallied outside the facility, some anti-abortion activists calling for Sims' resignation. He responded to calls for an apology or that he resign by calling critics bigoted, sexist, and misogynistic "Bible Bullies". Sims admitted to being "aggressive" in his confrontation.

2016 congressional campaign
In the 2016 elections, Sims was briefly a candidate for Pennsylvania's 2nd congressional district, but opted to run for re-election to the Pennsylvania House of Representatives instead. Sims was challenged by Lou Lanni, Marni Snyder, and Ben Waxman in the Democratic primary, defeating all three. Sims did not face a Republican challenger in the November 2016 general election.

2022 lieutenant governor campaign 

On February 15, 2021, Sims announced via Twitter that he was running for lieutenant governor in the 2022 election.

Sims' campaign struggled to take off. Both Josh Shapiro, the Pennsylvania Attorney General and presumptive Democratic nominee for Governor, and the Pennsylvania Democratic Party endorsed State Representative Austin Davis for Lieutenant Governor. Seven Democratic State Representative and State Senate caucus leaders came forward and called for Sims to drop out from the race saying he was putting "his own self-interests above that of the party." Shapiro's campaign issued a “cease and desist” letter to Sims' campaign after Sims' campaign ran ads falsely implying that Sims was endorsed by Shapiro.

Sims lost the primary election to Davis in a landslide. Sims finished in a distant second place, with 24.9% of the vote, compared to Davis' 63.1%. Davis won every county in the state including Sims' home county of Philadelphia.

Following his loss, Sims was involved in a car crash with a state owned vehicle, injuring two people. Multiple attempts by the media to reach Sims for comment were unsuccessful.

Electoral history

See also
Equality Pennsylvania
Homosexuality in American football

References

External links

Brian Sims for Pennsylvania official campaign website
State Representative Brian Sims official caucus website
Representative Brian Sims (D) official PA House website

1978 births
21st-century American politicians
American former Christians
American people of Irish descent
Bloomsburg Huskies football players
Bloomsburg University of Pennsylvania alumni
Critics of the Catholic Church
Former Roman Catholics
Gay politicians
Gay sportsmen
LGBT players of American football
American LGBT rights activists
American LGBT sportspeople
LGBT state legislators in Pennsylvania
Living people
Democratic Party members of the Pennsylvania House of Representatives
Michigan State University College of Law alumni
Pennsylvania lawyers
Players of American football from Pennsylvania
Politicians from Washington, D.C.
21st-century LGBT people